Jerzy Wujecki (born 20 October 1956) is a sailor from Szczecin, Poland, who competed in the 1980 Summer Olympics in Tallinn as a crew member in the Soling event. With helmsman Jan Bartosik and fellow crew member Zdzislaw Kotla they took the 9th place.

References

Living people
1956 births
Sailors at the 1980 Summer Olympics – Soling
Olympic sailors of Poland
Polish male sailors (sport)